Van Alphen is a Dutch toponymic surname indicating an origin in Alphen in South Holland, Alphen in North Brabant, Alphen in Gelderland, Alpen (once "Alphen") in North Rhine-Westphalia, or Teralfene in Flemish Brabant. Notable people with the surname include:

Dick van Alphen (1938–2009), Dutch-born Australian soccer player
Hans Van Alphen (born 1982), Belgian decathlete
Hieronymus van Alphen (1746–1803), Dutch Treasurer-General and children's poet
Isaac Van Alphen (f. 1881), Postmaster General of the South African Republic
John Van Alphen (1914–1961), Belgian footballer and manager
Jopie van Alphen (born 1940), Dutch backstroke swimmer

See also
De Haas–van Alphen effect, discovered by Wander Johannes de Haas and his student Pieter M. van Alphen (1906-1967)
20 van Alphen, road running race held in Alphen aan den Rijn

References

Dutch-language surnames
Surnames of Dutch origin
Toponymic surnames